WAIV (102.3 FM) is a radio station licensed that serves Cape May, New Jersey. The station is owned by Equity Communications, L.P. and it simulcasts the Top 40-CHR radio format on co-owned 95.1 WAYV Atlantic City. The studios and offices are in the Bayport One complex in West Atlantic City.

History
102.3 first signed on June 3, 1967 as WRIO-FM, in a religious format. The WRIO calls had previously been used on the 101.7 frequency. In 1983, 102.3's call letters were changed to WSJL, which stood for "South Jersey's Lighthouse." WSJL continued the religious format until 1995.

In July 1995, WSJL began simulcasting sister station 99.3 WMID-FM, which was formatted as a rock station at the time. In 1997, both stations changed formats to smooth jazz. 99.3 picked up the call sign WSAX while 102.3 became WJSX.

In 2000, when 99.3 became a simulcast of The Buzz 105.5, WJSX continued in the smooth jazz format but changed its calls to 99.3's now former WSAX.

In 2001, smooth jazz ended on 102.3. The station became a simulcast of sister station 1340 WMID, which was playing standards at the time; its call sign changed to WMID-FM (which had once been on 99.3). Two years later, WMID-FM, along with sister stations WZBZ, WGBZ and WMID were sold to Equity Communications in Atlantic City. 102.3 began simulcasting 95.1 WAYV, and changed its call sign again to WAIV.

In 2011, WAYV/WAIV, along with sister station WZXL, were named official stations of the Wildwoods boardwalk. Because the WAIV frequency is much stronger near Wildwood than in other towns in the listening area, the 102.3 frequency was advertised slightly more during this time than it is closer to Atlantic City. This included signs on the boardwalk's famous tram cars advertising both frequencies.

On August 26, 2013, WAIV swapped formats and call signs with sister station WSNQ.

On July 7, 2014, WSNQ changed their call letters to WGBZ and changed their format to rhythmic contemporary, simulcasting WZBZ 99.3 FM Pleasantville, New Jersey.

In January 2021, with the impending sale of 105.5 WAIV to Christian broadcaster The Bridge, WGBZ ended simulcasting WZBZ and began simulcasting again with WAYV. WGBZ changed its call sign to WAIV on February 23, 2021.

See also
 WZBZ

References

External links
Officil website
 

AIV
Contemporary hit radio stations in the United States
Radio stations established in 1967
1967 establishments in New Jersey